The 2022 R-League A Division is the 3rd season of the Rajasthan State Men's League, the first professional league in the Indian state of Rajasthan. It is organised by the Rajasthan Football Association.

Teams 
A total of 9 teams participated in the league.

Standings

References 

Football in Rajasthan